Wirgiliusz Gryń (9 June 1928 – 3 September 1986) was a Polish actor. He appeared in more than 60 films and television shows between 1964 and 1986. At the 13th Moscow International Film Festival he won the award for Best Actor for his role in Pastorale heroica.

Selected filmography
 Matthew's Days (1968)
 How I Unleashed World War II (1969)
 Pastorale heroica (1983)

References

External links

1928 births
1986 deaths
20th-century Polish male actors
Polish male film actors
People from Dąbrowa Górnicza
Polish male stage actors